Dolichodoridae is a family of nematodes belonging to the order Tylenchida.

Genera

Genera:
 Amplimerlinius Siddiqi, 1976
 Brachydorus de Guiran & Germani, 1968
 Carphodorus Colbran, 1965

References

Nematodes